Web indexing, or internet indexing, comprises methods for indexing the contents of a website or of the Internet as a whole. Individual websites or intranets may use a back-of-the-book index, while search engines usually use keywords and metadata to provide a more useful vocabulary for Internet or onsite searching. With the increase in the number of periodicals that have articles online, web indexing is also becoming important for periodical websites.

Back-of-the-book-style web indexes may be called "web site A-Z indexes". The implication with "A-Z" is that there is an alphabetical browse view or interface. This interface differs from that of a browse through layers of hierarchical categories (also known as a taxonomy) which are not necessarily alphabetical, but are also found on some web sites. Although an A-Z index could be used to index multiple sites, rather than the multiple pages of a single site, this is unusual.

Metadata web indexing involves assigning keywords, description or phrases to web pages or web sites within a metadata tag (or "meta-tag") field, so that the web page or web site can be retrieved with a list. This method is commonly used by search engine indexing.

See also
 Automatic indexing
 Information architecture
 Search engine optimization
 On-page Optimization
 Google Webmaster 
 Site map
 Web navigation
 Web search engine
 Information retrieval

Further reading
Beyond Book Indexing: How to Get Started in Web Indexing, Embedded Indexing, and Other Computer-Based Media, edited by Marilyn Rowland and Diane Brenner, American Society of Indexers, Info Today, Inc, NJ, 2000, 
 An example of an Internet Index A-Z

References

Internet search algorithms
Index (publishing)